The AMT Automag III is a single action semi-automatic handgun, designed by Harry Sanford, creator of the first Automag. The Automag III does not actually fire a magnum cartridge,but is chambered for the .30 Carbine cartridge, which was originally designed for the World War II era M1 carbine. It was also originally chambered for the 9mm Winchester Magnum cartridge. Only the original AMT production pistols were made in 9mm Winchester Magnum. Later, Galena production was only in .30 Carbine. It is made of stainless steel and has an 8-round magazine.

See also
 AMT AutoMag II
 AMT AutoMag IV
 AMT AutoMag V

References

External links
Owner's manual
Modern Firearms

AMT semi-automatic pistols
Semi-auto magnum pistols
.30 Carbine firearms